The 1997 Trofeo Forla de Navarra was the 44th edition of the GP Miguel Induráin cycle race and was held on 6 April 1997. The race was won by Mikel Zarrabeitia.

General classification

References

1997
1997 in Spanish road cycling